Laomedeia , also known as Neptune XII, is a prograde irregular satellite of Neptune. It was discovered by Matthew J. Holman, et al. on August 13, 2002. Before the announcement of its name on February 3, 2007 (IAUC 8802), it was known as S/2002 N 3.

It orbits Neptune at a distance of about 23,571,000 km and is about 42 kilometers in diameter (assuming albedo of 0.04).  It is named after Laomedeia, one of the 50 Nereids.

References

External links 
 Neptune's Known Satellites, by Scott S. Sheppard
 David Jewitt pages
 MPC: Natural Satellites Ephemeris Service
 Mean orbital parameters, NASA

Moons of Neptune
Irregular satellites
 
20020813
Moons with a prograde orbit